The Imperial Post, Imperial Post Office, or Imperial Postal Service may refer to:

 The Kaiserliche Reichspost of the Holy Roman Empire
 The Thurn-und-Taxis Post, its successor
 The Chinese Imperial Post of the late Qing Dynasty in China, administered by the Chinese Maritime Customs Service
 The Russian Post before 1917
 The British Post Office before the mid-20th century
 The India Post under the British Raj